The 1931 Washington State Cougars football team was an American football team that represented Washington State College during the 1931 college football season. Head coach Babe Hollingbery led the team to a 6–4 overall record, 4–3 in the Pacific Coast Conference (PCC).

Schedule

References

External links
 Game program: UCLA at WSC – October 3, 1931
 Game program: California vs. WSC at Portland – October 10, 1931
 Game program: Idaho at WSC – November 7, 1931

Washington State
Washington State Cougars football seasons
Washington State Cougars football